ATI Tray Tools (ATT) is a freeware program developed by Ray Adams for ATI Radeon video cards.

ATI Tray Tools is an advanced tweaker-application that resides in the notification area of the Windows taskbar and allows instant access to video options and settings via a right-click menu. It is normally used as an alternative to the more bulky official Catalyst Control Center (CCC), but it can also run in tandem with it.

Main features of ATI Tray Tools
The ability to change the resolution, colors, rotation, and extended desktop settings directly from ATT's right-click menu.
Changing of OpenGL/Direct3D settings (antialiasing or anisotropic filtering, for example) separate from one another.
Game profiles, a feature allowing specific OpenGL/Direct3D settings for each game or 3d application.
Over/UnderClocking of GPU and Memory of video boards
Hotkey mapping
The taking of screenshots
Hardware monitoring
OnScreen Display: When an OpenGL/Direct3D application running, the FPS, 3D API type, GPU Activity, and related information are overlaid on top of the rendering stream on a corner of the screen.
CrossFire support
Support of nearly 20 languages
Support for plugins created for ATI Tray Tools

Supported operating systems
ATI Tray Tools supports both 32 and 64-bit versions of:
Windows 2000
Windows XP
Windows Server 2003
Most builds of Windows Codename: Longhorn
Windows Vista
Windows Server 2008
Windows 7

Versions history
1.0 (February 3, 2004) - initial release
1.0.0.190 (February 5, 2004) - first update
1.0.0.195 (February 6, 2004)
1.0.0.200 (February 8, 2004)
1.0.0.205 (February 9, 2004)
1.0.1.516 (February 2, 2005)
1.0.1.527 (February 25, 2005)
1.0.1.528 (February 27, 2005)
1.0.1.538 (March 16, 2005)
1.0.2.600 (April 17, 2005)
1.0.2.625 (April 24, 2005)
1.0.2.640 (May 1, 2005)
1.0.2.663 (May 12, 2005)
1.0.2.673 (May 17, 2005)
1.0.2.685
1.0.2.690 (June 10, 2005)
1.0.2.705
1.0.3.720 (June 18, 2005)
1.0.3.730 (August 18, 2005)
1.0.3.750 (September 28, 2005)
1.0.3.755 (September 30, 2005)
1.0.4.780 (October 19, 2005)
1.0.5.815 (January 9, 2006)
1.0.5.820 (January 17, 2006)
1.0.5.824 (January 27, 2006)
1.0.5.877 (April 14, 2006)
1.0.5.880 (April 17, 2006)
1.2.6.930 (September 19, 2006)
1.2.6.940 (September 28, 2006)
1.2.6.955 (November 6, 2006)
1.2.6.964 (December 6, 2006)
1.3.6.1042 (May 22, 2007)

Beta Versions
1.3.6.1056 Beta (September 17, 2007)
1.3.6.1066 Beta (October 29, 2007)
1.3.6.1067 Beta (November 5, 2007) -  {bundled with Omega driver 4.8.442}
1.4.7.1185 Beta (May 23, 2008)
1.4.7.1206 Beta (June 26, 2008)
1.5.9.1294 Beta (September 16, 2008)
1.6.9.1340 Beta (October 3, 2008)
1.6.9.1374 Beta (December 9, 2008)
1.6.9.1382 Beta (February 21, 2009)
1.6.9.1386 Beta (April 9, 2009)
1.6.9.1391 Beta (July 28, 2009)
1.6.9.1435 Beta (November 18, 2009)
1.6.9.1472 Beta (February 6, 2010)
1.6.9.1486 Beta (April 22, 2010)
1.7.9.1528 Beta (November 15, 2010)
1.7.9.1531 Beta (December 10, 2010)
1.7.9.1537 Beta (December 24, 2010)
1.7.9.1551 Beta (March 19, 2011)
1.7.9.1564 Beta (May 25, 2011)
1.7.9.1573 Beta (October 31, 2011)

Main Features of 1.4.7.xxxx versions
HD2xxx/HD3xxx cards are supported
Nearly full DirectX 10 support
CPU monitoring
Main Features of 1.5.x.xxxx versions
 HD4xxx support
 Overclocking and monitoring of both video boards in CrossFire
 Redesigned Monitoring of Graphs and FlashOSD
 Full DirectX 10 support
Main Features of 1.6.x.xxxx versions
 Full Unicode Support
Main Features of 1.7.9.xxxx versions
 Force RefreshRate option has been removed
 Updated support for HD5xxx series. New AA modes have been included. Please recreate your 3D profiles if you have HD5xxx/6xxx video board
 Implemented support for HD6870/HD6850
 Improved support for some HD5xxx boards
 Support for new AI modes has been implemented for HD5xxx/HD6xxx
 Implemented high granularity for LOD adjustment
 Fixed bug when LOD value doesn't get applied when you load profile from main menu
 Fixed bug when value of FlipQueueSize doesn't properly restored
 Included delay option before applying colors for game profile
 Implemented support for HD6970/HD6950
 Implemented support for AA Enhanced Quality introduced in new Catalyst drivers

See also
3D computer graphics
Tweaking
Overclocking

External links
 ATI Tray Tools Homepage
 ATI Tray Tools Homepage
ATI Tray Tools Beta Discussion
Troubleshooting Ati Tray Tools Driver Issues
GPU Overclocking Apps Review with Interview of RivaTuner Creator

References

Windows-only freeware